Stitch & Ai is an English-language-produced donghua television series and a spin-off of Disney's Lilo & Stitch franchise. It is the franchise's third TV series, after the Western animated Lilo & Stitch: The Series and the Japanese Stitch! anime series. It was produced with the assistance of American animators. Set in Huangshan, Anhui, the thirteen-episode series features a Chinese girl named Wang Ai Ling in place of the original 2002–06 Western continuity's Lilo Pelekai and the anime's Yuna Kamihara as the titular human companion of the alien Stitch.

The series first aired in China with a Mandarin Chinese dub from March 27 to April 6, 2017. The original English-language version first aired from February 5 to 27, 2018, in Southeast Asia on that region's Disney Channel. Twelve episodes of the series were available for free digital streaming in the United States via DisneyNow from December 1, 2018, to around June 2019.

Plot
Stitch & Ai follows the events of Lilo & Stitch and its subsequent film and television sequels up to and including Leroy & Stitch, set around 2016. The series shows Stitch kidnapped by the Jaboodies, a faction of alien criminals who want to use him to win a space war after hacking a United Galactic Federation database and discovering a previously-unrevealed "metamorphosis program" that was secretly programmed in Stitch. This function causes the experiment to grow into a giant beast with four laser-firing tentacles when his destructive programming is triggered in a large city. However, a rival faction called the Woolagongs, who managed to steal the stolen data from the Jaboodies, board the Jaboodies' battle cruiser spaceship to try to kidnap Stitch for themselves from the Jaboodies, only for Stitch to be freed in the fighting. He escapes back to Earth, ending up in China's Huangshan mountains.

In Huangshan, Stitch meets Wang Ai Ling, a spirited local girl at risk of being separated from her older sister Jiejie by their aunt Daiyu after the sisters lost their parents in the past year. Daiyu, who hates the mountains and lives in a city, desires to move Ai in with her, believing that Ai would live a better life in the city, but Ai loves her home and is resistant to the idea. Stitch quickly befriends Ai and becomes her new "dog", and the two help one another deal with the other's problems; Ai helps Stitch fight off the Jaboodies and Woolagongs so he wouldn't be taken or used by either of them, as well as help find a shrine that he's been seeing in unusual visions he's been having, while he helps her ward off Daiyu's attempts to take her away in order to have her stay in the mountains with Jiejie. Jumba and Pleakley later show up initially trying to rescue Stitch and bring him back to the United Galactic Federation, but Ai and Jiejie convince the two aliens to let Stitch stay with them, letting them stay to keep a watch on Stitch and to help out him and his new family.

The series also features various flashbacks to key scenes in the franchise that appear in "Hello – Goodbye", "Teacher's Pet", and "Monstrosity". The flashbacks consist of closely re-animated sequences, copying the originals to the best of their ability. The flashback scenes are based on scenes from the original Lilo & Stitch, Lilo & Stitch 2: Stitch Has a Glitch, and The Origin of Stitch. In co-ordinance with this, there are occasional appearances from previous characters of the Lilo & Stitch franchise, including Captain Gantu, the Grand Councilwoman, Cobra Bubbles, the Ice Cream Man, and (briefly and from a distance) Dr. Hämsterviel.

Characters

 Stitch – An alien genetic experiment also known as Experiment 626. He was kidnapped by space criminals who want to use him so they can have their own evil genetic experiment, but he manages to escape back to Earth, ending up in China. He befriends a local girl named Ai, who takes him into her family. He is voiced in English by Ben Diskin, who also voiced the character in the Stitch! anime, and in Mandarin by Li Zhengxiang.
 Wang Ai Ling – A Chinese girl who lives in the Huangshan mountains. Her aunt wants to move her to the city, but she wants to stay in the mountains. Ai befriends Stitch, taking him in as her "dog", and helps him ward off the warring alien factions that want him. She serves as this series's counterpart to Lilo Pelekai. She is voiced in English by Erica Mendez, who tweeted that she is a fan of Stitch and getting to voice his companion in a series was "a dream come true" for her. In Mandarin, the character is voiced by Jiang Sunwei.
 Wang Jiejie – A young Chinese woman who tries to take care of her younger sister Ai after their parents' death. She works at a tea shop for a man named Mr. Ding. She serves as this series's counterpart to Nani Pelekai. She is voiced in English by Laura Post and in Mandarin by Li Yan.
 Qian Dahu – Jiejie's boyfriend and Ai's drum instructor. He serves as this series's counterpart to David Kawena, with an element of Moses Puloki with regards to his teachings of a local tradition. He is voiced in English by Lucien Dodge.
 Jumba Jookiba – The Kweltikwan creator of Stitch. He is sent by the Grand Councilwoman to retrieve Stitch from the space criminals that captured him. However, after reuniting with Stitch in China and meeting his new family, Jumba decides to let Stitch to stay with Ai, sticking around himself to assist and watch over him. The show also reveals that he is the galaxy's leading expert on metamorphosis. He is voiced in English by Jess Winfield, who previously served as screenwriter and executive producer for Lilo & Stitch: The Series and its films Stitch! The Movie and Leroy & Stitch, and voiced the same character in the Stitch! anime. In Mandarin, the character is voiced by Cheng Yuzhu.
 Wendy Pleakley – A Plorgonarian former United Galactic Federation agent and Jumba's partner. He is also sent by the Grand Councilwoman to retrieve Stitch alongside Jumba. After Jumba decides to let Stitch stay with Ai, Pleakley also stays with Stitch's new family and tries to help out. He is voiced in English by Lucien Dodge and in Mandarin by Hu Qian.
 Daiyu – Ai and Jiejie's mysophobic aunt who believes that Ai should not be living in the "dirty" mountains and move to the city, despite her nieces' protests. She is voiced in English by Laura Post and in Mandarin by Yan Lixuan.
 Meiying  – Ai's rival who serves as this series's counterpart to Mertle Edmonds. She is voiced in English by Cherami Leigh and Xanthe Huynh.
 Sage – A wise but mysterious sage who observes Stitch and Ai's journey, appearing to them at times. He hands ancient scrolls to Jumba so the Kweltikwan can use them to make ancient Chinese creatures. He is voiced in English by Lucien Dodge.
 The Jaboodies – A race of reptilian-like alien creatures who are at war with the Woolagongs. They desire to use Experiment 626 (Stitch) and his metamorphosis program to make him fight for them to win their space war. They were the ones to have captured Stitch prior to the events the show. Their leader, Commander Wombat, is voiced in English by Richard Epcar.
 The Woolagongs – A race of platypus-like alien creatures who are at war with the Jaboodies. They also desire to use Stitch to make him fight for them to win their space war. They accidentally freed Stitch at the beginning of the series when they attack the Jaboodies' battle cruiser spaceship. Their leader, credited as "Platypus", is voiced in English by Lucien Dodge.
 Mr. Ding  – Jiejie's employer who runs a tea shop and likes to juggle tea kettles. He is voiced in English by Richard Epcar.
 Dim Long – An orange dragon-like experiment Jumba makes as a beta test for future experiments. He has the ability to fly without wings using the power of qi. Introduced in "The Lock", he acts as a pet to the aliens.

Kyle Hebert, Bobby Thong, Sarah Anne Williams, Deborah Crane, Jacob Craner, and Steve Kramer provide additional voices.

Episodes

Production
Stitch & Ai is produced by Anhui Xinhua Media and Panimation Hwakai Media in association with Disney with additional work by Showfun Animation, Shanghai Fire & Ice Media, and Shanghai Aoju Media. The series began broadcast on CCTV-14 on March 27, 2017. Unlike Stitch!, this series was produced in co-operation with American Disney animators to maintain a sense of visual continuity to the original American-produced films and TV series. The series was produced as part of an effort by Disney to enter the Chinese animation market. It was originally produced in English then dubbed into Mandarin Chinese.

Tony Craig, an executive producer of Lilo & Stitch: The Series who directed Stitch! The Movie, Leroy & Stitch, and the season two episodes "Spike" and "Shoe", served as director for Stitch & Ai. Victor Cook, who was a director for both seasons of Lilo & Stitch: The Series, was initially signed onto the Chinese series and even visited China to assist making the eighth episode. At first, Cook contacted Craig to storyboard the first episode, but when Cook had to drop out due to other commitments, he had Craig take over directing. Craig joined during pre-production, and had to delay joining in full due to a prior employment issue, although Panimation waited for him. Craig oversaw the storyboards, animatics, animation, most of the designs, and all the editing sessions, but he was not involved with the dialogue recordings, which happened in Los Angeles while Craig lives in North Carolina.

The show made its English premiere on Disney Channel Asia on February 5, 2018. The series (except for the ninth episode "The Phoenix") later became available in the United States for free streaming on DisneyNow on December 1, 2018. It was later removed from the service in June 2019.

Notes

References

External links
 
 Stitch & Ai on DisneyNow

Lilo & Stitch (franchise)
2017 Chinese television series debuts
2017 Chinese television series endings
2010s animated television series
2010s animated comedy television series
2010s science fiction television series
Chinese children's animated action television series
Chinese children's animated adventure television series
Chinese children's animated comic science fiction television series
Chinese children's animated science fantasy television series
Television series based on Disney films
Sequel television series
Animated television shows based on films
Disney animated television series
China Central Television original programming
Disney Channels Worldwide original programming
Animated television series about orphans
Animated television series about extraterrestrial life
Television shows set in Anhui
Animated television series spinoffs